The Ledge may refer to:

 The Ledge (film), a 2011 film by Matthew Chapman
 The Ledge (2022 film), a 2022 film by Howard J. Ford, starring Brittany Ashworth
 "The Ledge" (short story), a short story by Stephen King
 The Ledge, a 2005 short film by Quinn Duffy
 "The Ledge," a song on the album Pleased to Meet Me by The Replacements
 "The Ledge," a song on the album Tusk by Fleetwood Mac
 "The Ledge", an informal name for the glass balconies on the observation deck of the Willis Tower, Chicago
 The Ledge, shortened name of the Alberta Legislature Building
 Battle for the Ledge or Operation Krohcol (December 1941), a British operation in the Pacific theatre of WWII

See also
 Ledge (disambiguation)
 The Ledger, a daily newspaper serving Lakeland, Florida
 The Lodge (disambiguation)